Pazhakulam Punthalaveetil Temple is a Hindu temple in Kerala, India.

External links
 Devotees Facebook page

Hindu temples in Pathanamthitta district
Devi temples in Kerala